Sándor Soproni (Szentendre Kingdom of Hungary 21 November 1926 – Budapest, Hungary, 10. November 1995) was a classical archeologist, of the Roman period. He worked for the Ferenczy Museum in Szentendre and later became its director.

Life
He made excavation near Budakeszi for the ruins of the Baden–Pecel culture.

In his final years he taught at the Eötvös Loránd University’s Archeology Department.

The Museum of Stonework Finds in Bicske is named after him.

Sources
Tóth Endre 1995: Soproni Sándor (1926-1995).Numizmatikai közlöny 94-95/1, 135-136.

External links
Római kor blog

Hungarian archaeologists
Classical archaeologists
People from Szentendre
1926 births
1995 deaths
20th-century archaeologists